One Good Thing it the third solo album released by English singer-songwriter Lou Rhodes.  It was released in early 2010, following a reunion tour of Rhodes with her previous band Lamb.

History

The album was written and recorded during Lou Rhodes' 2009 reunion tour with her previous band Lamb. The album was the first recorded collaboration since 2004 between Rhodes and her former band co-member, Andy Barlow, who also co-produced the album. The album has been described as "incredibly intimate, introspective and emotional".  Another reviewer describes the album as "Rhodes essentially pick(ing) up where her 2007 album, Bloom, left off, using guitar and strings elegantly but sparingly, to underscore excerpts from her diary of the past three years." The song "Janey" refers to the death of her sister.

Track listing
All songs written by Lou Rhodes.

Credits

Musicians

Andy Barlow Drums (Bass), Fender Rhodes
Stephen Junior Guitar, Slide Guitar
Danny Keane Cello
Stella Page Violin
Antonia Pagulatos String Arrangements, Violin
Michael Pagulatos String Arrangements, Viola
Lou Rhodes Drums (Bass), Guitar, Tambourine, Vocals, Vocals (Background)
Jon Thorne Double Bass

Other

Andy Barlow Engineer, Mixing, Producer, Recording
Craig Besant Photography
Gordon Biggins Management
John Davis Mastering
Dilip Harris Production Input
Desmond Lambert Recording
Rebecca Millar Photography
Lou Rhodes Composer, Photography, Producer

References

2010 albums
Lou Rhodes albums